Simone Bolelli was the defending champion but chose not to defend his title.

Guido Andreozzi won the title after Daniel Gimeno Traver retired trailing 2–6, 0–3 in the final.

Seeds

Draw

Finals

Top half

Bottom half

External Links
Main Draw
Qualifying Draw

Tunis Open - Singles
2018 Singles